The Oaklands Hunt Club is an Australian fox hunting club located in the Greenvale, Victoria.

History
The club was established on 28 July 1888, after its inaugural hunt that day from the Inverness Hotel in Bulla.

The club's pony club was formed in 1956 by club members who wanted to encourage their children and the children of local landowners to ride.

For the modern pentathlon at the 1956 Summer Olympics, the club hosted the riding and cross-country running components.

See also
 Fox hunting

References

External links
 Baily's hunting directory, "Oaklands Hunt Club", bailyshuntingdirectory.com, retrieved 2 October 2016.

1888 establishments in Australia
Sports clubs established in the 1880s
Sporting clubs in Melbourne
Venues of the 1956 Summer Olympics
Olympic modern pentathlon venues
Equestrian sports in Australia
Sports venues in Melbourne
Fox hunts in Australia
Hunting organizations